Frank John Privett (28 December 1874 – 29 March 1937) was a British Conservative Party politician who served briefly as a Member of Parliament (MP) in the early 1920s.

He was first elected to the House of Commons at the general election in November 1922 for the Central division of Portsmouth.  His victory, by a majority of only 7 votes, came after a  closely fought four-way contest between Labour, Conservative, Liberal and National Liberal candidates, all of whom won over 21% of the votes.

The following year, at the general election in December 1923, the rift in the Liberal Party had been healed, and Privett lost the seat to Sir Thomas Bramsdon, the Liberal who he had beaten the previous year. After his defeat, Privett stood for Parliament on only one further occasion, when he was unsuccessful as an "Independent Conservative" candidate in the Southern division of Portsmouth at the 1929 general election.

References

External links 
 

Conservative Party (UK) MPs for English constituencies
1874 births
1937 deaths
UK MPs 1922–1923
Politicians from Portsmouth